Mortierella is a large genus of fungi in the order Mortierellales. , GBIF lists 121 species in the genus, many of which have not been fully described as species. This list ignores species which do not have a valid binomial name.

A
 Mortierella acrotona 
 Mortierella alliacea 
 Mortierella alpina 
 Mortierella ambigua 
 Mortierella amoeboidea 
 Mortierella angusta 
 Mortierella antarctica 
 Mortierella apiculata 
 Mortierella arcuata 
 Mortierella armillariicola

B
 Mortierella baccata 
 Mortierella bainier 
 Mortierella bainieri 
 Mortierella basiparvispora 
 Mortierella beljakovae 
 Mortierella biramosa 
 Mortierella bisporalis

C
 Mortierella calciphila 
 Mortierella camargensis 
 Mortierella candelabrum 
 Mortierella capitata 
 Mortierella cephalosporina 
 Mortierella chienii 
 Mortierella chlamydospora 
 Mortierella claussenii 
 Mortierella clonocystis 
 Mortierella cogitans 
 Mortierella cystojenkinii

D
 Mortierella dichotoma

E
 Mortierella echinosphaera 
 Mortierella echinula 
 Mortierella echinulata 
 Mortierella elasson 
 Mortierella elongata 
 Mortierella elongatula 
 Mortierella epicladia 
 Mortierella epigama 
 Mortierella exigua

F
 Mortierella fatshederae 
 Mortierella fimbriata 
 Mortierella fimbricystis 
 Mortierella fluviae 
 Mortierella formicae 
 Mortierella formosana

G
 Mortierella gamsii 
 Mortierella gemmifera 
 Mortierella globalpina 
 Mortierella globulifera

H
 Mortierella hepiali 
 Mortierella histoplasmatoides 
 Mortierella horticola 
 Mortierella humicola 
 Mortierella humilis 
 Mortierella humilis 
 Mortierella humilissima 
 Mortierella hyalina 
 Mortierella hypsicladia

I
 Mortierella indohii 
 Mortierella insignis

J
 Mortierella jenkinii

K
 Mortierella kuhlmanii

L
 Mortierella lignicola 
 Mortierella longigemmata

M
 Mortierella macrocystis 
 Mortierella macrocystopsis 
 Mortierella mairei 
 Mortierella malleola 
 Mortierella mehrotraensis 
 Mortierella microspora 
 Mortierella microzygospora 
 Mortierella minutissima 
 Mortierella mundensis 
 Mortierella mutabilis

N
 Mortierella nantahalensis 
 Mortierella niveovelutina

O
 Mortierella oligospora 
 Mortierella oligospora 
 Mortierella ovalispora

P
 Mortierella paraensis 
 Mortierella parazychae 
 Mortierella parvispora 
 Mortierella pilulifera 
 Mortierella pisiformis 
 Mortierella plectoconfusa 
 Mortierella polycephala 
 Mortierella polygonia 
 Mortierella porcellionum 
 Mortierella pseudozygospora 
 Mortierella pulchella 
 Mortierella pusilla 
 Mortierella pygmaea

R
 Mortierella repens 
 Mortierella reticulata 
 Mortierella rhizogena 
 Mortierella rishikesha 
 Mortierella rostafinskii

S
 Mortierella sarnyensis 
 Mortierella schmuckeri 
 Mortierella sclerotiella 
 Mortierella selenospora 
 Mortierella signyensis 
 Mortierella simplex 
 Mortierella strangulata 
 Mortierella striospora 
 Mortierella stylospora 
 Mortierella subtilissima 
 Mortierella sugadairana

T
 Mortierella thereuopodae 
 Mortierella tirolensis 
 Mortierella traversoana 
 Mortierella tsukubaensis 
 Mortierella tuberosa 
 Mortierella turficola

U
 Mortierella umbellata

V
 Mortierella verrucosa 
 Mortierella verticillata

W
 Mortierella wolfii 
 Mortierella wuyishanensis

Z
 Mortierella zonata 
 Mortierella zychae

References

Mortierella